Charles Clyde "Charlie" Teague (November 5, 1921, Guilford County, North Carolina – May 8, 1996, Greensboro, North Carolina) was an American professional baseball player. A second baseman, he played in minor league baseball. As a college baseball player for Wake Forest University, he was named an All-American in three seasons. In 2010, he was inducted into the National College Baseball Hall of Fame.

Career
Teague attended Eugene High School. He was named captain of his school's baseball team in a vote amongst the players.

Teague attended Wake Forest University from 1947 through 1950, playing college baseball for the Wake Forest Demon Deacons baseball team. He was the first Demon Deacon to be named an All-American in baseball, receiving the honor three times.

The Chicago Cubs signed Teague in 1950 and assigned him to begin his professional career in minor league baseball with the Des Moines Bruins of the Western League.

Teague was posthumously elected to the National College Baseball Hall of Fame in 2010.

References

External links

1921 births
1996 deaths
Baseball players from North Carolina
Baseball second basemen
Wake Forest Demon Deacons baseball players
National College Baseball Hall of Fame inductees
Des Moines Bruins players
Springfield Cubs players
Hickory Rebels players
Cedar Rapids Indians players
All-American college baseball players